They Came Together is a 2014 American satirical romantic comedy film directed by David Wain and written by Wain and Michael Showalter. It is a parody of romantic comedies infused with Showalter and Wain's absurd approach. The film had its world premiere at the 2014 Sundance Film Festival, and was released theatrically (with a simultaneous release on iTunes) on June 27, 2014.

Plot
Joel and Molly have dinner with an unhappy couple, Kyle and Karen, and recount how they first began dating. At the time, Molly owned a small independent candy store, Upper Sweet Side, that was being bought out by Joel's company, a larger candy corporation called CSR. Joel lived with his girlfriend, Tiffany, until he caught her cheating on him with his coworker Trevor.

On their way to the same Halloween party, Joel and Molly meet. They initially fight, but end up going on a date, where Joel meets Molly's son from a previous relationship. Joel admits that he is not over his relationship with Tiffany, and Molly leaves angrily. Joel apologizes, and the two begin dating. They break up after a trip to Molly's parents' house, who are revealed to be white supremacists.  Joel begins dating Tiffany again, and Molly begins dating her banker, Eggbert. Molly and Eggbert become engaged, and Joel realizes that he is still in love with Molly, and races to the wedding. He arrives to find that she has already left Eggbert at the altar, and goes to the Brooklyn Promenade to find her. They agree to get back together, but Molly's ex-husband Spike, who was just released from jail, confronts Joel. Joel wins the fight, and Spike is taken by the police, only to be shot in the head when he tries to escape. Joel and Molly get married, and Joel opens a coffee shop attached to Upper Sweet Side.

In the present, Joel and Molly reveal that they are getting divorced, as their marriage has since fallen apart due to increasing debts. Because of it Molly got addicted to pills and she started sleeping with Frank again. So, Molly and Joel mutually decided they should be friends. After telling their story to Kyle and Karen, Joel and Molly wonder and then agree giving  their marriage another shot.

Cast

Paul Rudd as Joel
Amy Poehler as Molly
Cobie Smulders as Tiffany Amber Thigpen
Christopher Meloni as Roland, Joel's boss
Max Greenfield as Jake
Bill Hader as Kyle
Ellie Kemper as Karen
Jason Mantzoukas as Bob, Joel's best friend
Melanie Lynskey as Brenda
Ed Helms as Eggbert Flaps
Noureen DeWulf as Melanie
Michael Ian Black as Trevor
Michaela Watkins as Habermeyer
Randall Park as Martinson
Teyonah Parris as Wanda
David Wain as Keith Flaps
Jack McBrayer as Oliver
Kenan Thompson as Teddy
Ken Marino as Tommy
Erinn Hayes as Valerie
Zandy Hartig as Katherine
Zak Orth as Waiter with Pole
Norah Jones as Herself
Adam Scott as Sound Engineer
John Stamos as  Assistant Engineer
Maureen Mueller as Pam
Michael Murphy as Roger
Alberto Vazquez as Mexican Waiter
Lynn Cohen as Bubby
Jeffrey Dean Morgan as Frank
Michael Shannon as Spike
Judge Judy Sheindlin as Herself

Production
The film was written by David Wain and Michael Showalter.  Rudd and Poehler participated in a table read of the script at the SF Sketchfest in January 2012.

Release
The film had its world premiere at the Sundance Film Festival on January 24, 2014., the film went on to screen at  the Sundance London Film Festival on April 26, 2014., and went on to screen at the Chicago Critics Film Festival, Seattle International Film Festival, BAMcinema Fest., The film was released in the United States on June 27, 2014 in a limited release and through video on demand by Lionsgate.

Reception
On review aggregator Rotten Tomatoes the film holds an approval rating of 70% based on 97 reviews, with an average rating of 6.5/10. The website's critics consensus states: "They Came Together is surprisingly messy and perhaps too smart for its own good, but Amy Poehler and Paul Rudd's chemistry is enough to overcome many of the movie's flaws." On Metacritic, it was assigned a weighted average score of 60 out of 100, based on 27 critics, indicating "mixed or average reviews".

References

External links
 
 

2014 films
2014 romantic comedy films
American parody films
American romantic comedy films
Films directed by David Wain
Films set in New York City
Lionsgate films
2010s English-language films
2010s American films